Hubbleton is an unincorporated community located in the town of Milford, Jefferson County, Wisconsin, United States. The community was named for Levi Hubbell, a Wisconsin circuit court judge and politician.

Notes

Unincorporated communities in Jefferson County, Wisconsin
Unincorporated communities in Wisconsin